Italy has sent delegations to the World Games since the first games in 1981.

Medal Tables
Italy than to have won on three occasions the medal of the Games, he finished 4 more times on the podium and leads also to the all-time medals.

See also
Italy at the Olympics
Italy at the Paralympics
World Games all time medal table

References

External links
 All the medals of the World Games at Sports 123

 
Nations at the World Games